Route 124 is an east/west provincial highway in the Canadian province of New Brunswick. The road runs from Route 1 exit 175 in Norton as far as the Saint John River, where it crosses the Evandale Ferry to Evandale and an intersection with Route 102. The road has a length of approximately 41.3 kilometres, excluding the distance across the river, and services small, otherwise isolated rural communities. In these areas, the highway is often unofficially referred to as "Mountain Road."

This route intersects with New Brunswick Route 850.

Communities along Route 124
 Norton
 Midland
 Springfield
 Hatfield Point
 Kars
 Evandale

See also
List of New Brunswick provincial highways

References

New Brunswick provincial highways
Roads in Kings County, New Brunswick